The Fairmount Heights Historic District encompasses an area of  in the historic heart of Fairmount Heights, Maryland.  The area is notable as one of the first planned African-American communities in the Washington, D.C., area.  Predominantly residential in character, most of its housing stock was built between 1900 and 1960, although there has also been recent development.  The district includes the original town hall (built 1908). and the first public school for African-Americans in the county (built 1912).  There are also five churches and a community center, all important centers of political activism during the period of segregation.

The district was listed on the National Register of Historic Places in 2011; in the listing it is spelled "Fairmont".

See also
National Register of Historic Places listings in Prince George's County, Maryland

References

External links
, including undated photo, at Maryland Historical Trust website

African-American history of Prince George's County, Maryland
Historic districts in Prince George's County, Maryland
National Register of Historic Places in Prince George's County, Maryland
Houses on the National Register of Historic Places in Maryland
Colonial Revival architecture in Maryland
Tudor Revival architecture in Maryland
Houses in Prince George's County, Maryland
Historic districts on the National Register of Historic Places in Maryland